Cutaneous lymphoma, also known as lymphoma cutis, is when lymphoma involves the skin. It is characterized by a proliferation of lymphoid tissue.

There are two main classes of lymphomas that affect the skin:
 Cutaneous T-cell lymphoma
 Cutaneous B-cell lymphoma

References 

Lymphoid-related cutaneous conditions
Lymphoma